Shock Treatment is the fourth studio album by Edgar Winter and the second by the Edgar Winter Group. The album went to No. 13 on the Billboard Pop Albums chart, and had two charting singles: "Easy Street" (#83 Pop Singles) and "River's Risin'" (#33 Pop Singles).  The album was certified gold July 18, 1974 by the RIAA. In Canada, the album reached #9 (2 weeks) and was #69 in the year end chart.

Track listing

Personnel
Edgar Winter - Clavinet, Mellotron, organ, piano, ARP 2600, vibraphone, saxophone, vocals
Rick Derringer - guitar, electric sitar, bass, vocals, producer
Dan Hartman - bass, guitar, percussion, autoharp, vocals
Chuck Ruff - drums

Technical personnel 
Teresa Alfieri - design
Vic Anesini - mastering
Jimmy Iovine - assistant engineer
Bill King - photography
Lou Schlossberg - assistant engineer
Shelly Yakus - engineer
Lehman Yates - assistant engineer

References

External links
 

1974 albums
Edgar Winter albums
Epic Records albums
Albums produced by Rick Derringer